The Sunda scops owl (Otus lempiji) is a small brown owl native to the Sunda Islands.

Taxonomy
The taxon is considered a subspecies of Otus bakkamoena by some authors.

Description
It is speckled with black on the upper parts and streaked with black on the lower parts. It has a light collar and dark eyes, which differentiate it from the reddish scops, mountain scops, Oriental scops and Rajah scops owls.

Distribution and habitat
It lives on the Malay Peninsula, Singapore, Borneo, Sumatra and Java. It can be found primarily in forests and gardens but is occasionally attracted to buildings.

Diet
The diet of the Sunda scops owl mainly consists of insects, as well as small animals such as geckos and lizards.

Conservation
It has been included in the IUCN Red List of threatened species as a least concern species. It is common throughout its range where there is suitable habitat.

Behaviour

Breeding
The Sunda scops owl lines its nest with plant fibre. It will lay up to three eggs in a tree hollow from January to April and their breeding season can sometimes be extended to June or late July. The Sunda scops owl tends to behave aggressively when threatened by other owls by displaying territorial behavior. A female Sunda scops owl will react aggressively when feeling threatened by responding vocally to warn intruders from interfering and keeping them at a distance.

Voice
Its call is a hooting yelp in between a longer period of silence. The Sunda Scops owls use their callings to mark their territory and have evolved to have voice individuality to improve their territory proclamation. Every owl has its own unique vocal characteristics such as varying frequencies at which they produce their callings/noises which gives them each a unique voice. Having a unique voice/calling makes it easier for an owl to stand out from its competitors and mark its territory more effectively.

Gallery

References

Further reading
Yee, S. A., Puan, C. L., Chang, P. K., & Azhar, B. (2016). Vocal Individuality of Sunda Scops-Owl ( Otus lempiji) in Peninsular Malaysia. Journal of Raptor Research, 50(4), 379–390. 
World Owl Trust: Sunda Scops Owl

Sunda scops owl
Birds of Malesia
Sunda scops owl